Anthony George Cartwright (born 8 August 1940 in Timaru) was a New Zealand cricketer who played six first-class matches for Otago in the Plunket Shield. He also played for North Otago in the Hawke Cup.

See also
 List of Otago representative cricketers

External links 
  from Cricinfo.
  from CricketArchive.

1940 births
Living people
New Zealand cricketers
Otago cricketers